, refers to a type of rain that falls hard, then gently, in fits and starts. In Japanese poetic tradition, it is particularly associated with the cold rains of autumn.

Murasame may refer to:

Fiction
 MVF-M11C Murasame, a combat vehicle from Mobile Suit Gundam SEED Destiny
 Nazo no Murasame Jō, a 1986 video game for Nintendo's Famicom Disk System
 tsure Murasame, one of two sisters in the Noh drama Matsukaze
 Murasame Liger, a mecha from Zoids: Genesis
 One Slice Kill: Murasame, a long katana from the Akame ga Kill! manga and anime
 A demon known to turn into a deity-slaying katana in Hakkenden: Touhou Hakken Ibun
 A cursed broom that brings upon a bad luck to the user, later turned into a shikigami by Machi in Nagasarete Airantou

Ships
 , two classes of destroyers of the Japan Maritime Self-Defense Force
 , four destroyers of the Imperial Japanese Navy and the Japan Maritime Self-Defense Force

Other
 Murasame, a dōjin soft hobbyist group

See also
 Masamune
 Muramasa